The enzyme tartronate-semialdehyde synthase catalyzes the chemical reaction

2 glyoxylate  tartronate semialdehyde + CO2

This enzyme belongs to the family of lyases, specifically the carboxy-lyases, which cleave carbon-carbon bonds.  The systematic name of this enzyme class is glyoxylate carboxy-lyase (dimerizing tartronate-semialdehyde-forming). Other names in common use include tartronate semialdehyde carboxylase, glyoxylate carbo-ligase, glyoxylic carbo-ligase, hydroxymalonic semialdehyde carboxylase, tartronic semialdehyde carboxylase, glyoxalate carboligase, and glyoxylate carboxy-lyase (dimerizing).  This enzyme participates in glyoxylate and dicarboxylate metabolism.  It has 2 cofactors: FAD,  and Thiamin diphosphate.

References

 
 

EC 4.1.1
Flavoproteins
Thiamin diphosphate enzymes
Enzymes of unknown structure